Egerton Marcus (born February 2, 1965) is a Canadian former professional boxer who competed from 1989 to 2007. As an amateur, he won the silver medal in the middleweight division at the 1988 Summer Olympics in Seoul.

Early life
Egerton is the third child of five. He has two older brothers (Neville and Christopher D. Amos) and two younger sisters (Sharon and Felicia). Born in Goed Fortuin, Essequibo Islands-West Demerara, British Guiana, he came to Canada in 1973 and was raised in Toronto, Ontario. He is the nephew of Charles Amos who fought for Guyana in the 1968 Summer Olympics and first cousin of Troy Amos-Ross who competed in the light heavyweight division at the 1996 Summer Olympics in Atlanta, Georgia and 2000 Summer Olympics in Sydney, Australia.

Amateur career
Egerton won the middleweight silver medal representing Canada at the 1988 Olympics in Seoul, South Korea. His results were:
1st round bye
Defeated Emmanuel Legaspi (Philippines) KO 1
Defeated Darko Dukić (Yugoslavia) KO 2
Defeated Sven Ottke (West Germany) 5-0
Defeated Hussain Shah Syed (Pakistan) 4-1
Lost to Henry Maske (East Germany) 0-5

Professional career
Marcus turned pro in 1989 and began his career with fourteen consecutive wins, including a bloody TKO win over former Olympian Andrew Maynard. In 1995 he challenged Henry Maske for the IBF Light Heavyweight Title and lost by unanimous decision. Marcus's career then veered off track, culminating with a TKO loss to Donovan Ruddock at heavyweight. Marcus initially retired in 2001 with a record of 17-4-1.In 2007, Marcus came out of retirement to beat Carl Gathright.

Professional boxing record

|-
|align="center" colspan=8|17 Wins (12 knockouts, 5 decisions), 5 Losses (3 knockouts, 2 decision), 1 Draw
|-
| align="center" style="border-style: none none solid solid; background: #e3e3e3"|Result
| align="center" style="border-style: none none solid solid; background: #e3e3e3"|Record
| align="center" style="border-style: none none solid solid; background: #e3e3e3"|Opponent
| align="center" style="border-style: none none solid solid; background: #e3e3e3"|Type
| align="center" style="border-style: none none solid solid; background: #e3e3e3"|Round
| align="center" style="border-style: none none solid solid; background: #e3e3e3"|Date
| align="center" style="border-style: none none solid solid; background: #e3e3e3"|Location
| align="center" style="border-style: none none solid solid; background: #e3e3e3"|Notes
|-align=center
|Win
|
|align=left| Carl Gathright
|UD
|8
|21/07/2007
|align=left| Richmond, British Columbia, Canada
|align=left|
|-
|Loss
|
|align=left| Donovan Ruddock
|TKO
|10
|12/10/2001
|align=left| Niagara Falls, New York, United States
|align=left|
|-
|Win
|
|align=left| Troy Roberts
|TKO
|1
|22/02/2001
|align=left| Edmonton, Alberta, Canada
|align=left|
|-
|Win
|
|align=left| Tim Ray
|TKO
|1
|22/10/1999
|align=left| Detroit, Michigan, United States
|align=left|
|-
|Loss
|
|align=left| Lyle McDowell
|TKO
|7
|13/02/1998
|align=left| Edmonton, Alberta, Canada
|align=left|
|-
|Loss
|
|align=left| Brian LaSpada
|TKO
|8
|11/03/1997
|align=left| Phoenix, Arizona, United States
|align=left|
|-
|Loss
|
|align=left| John McClain
|PTS
|12
|18/07/1995
|align=left| Flint, Michigan, United States
|align=left|
|-
|Loss
|
|align=left| Henry Maske
|UD
|12
|11/02/1995
|align=left| Frankfurt, Germany
|align=left|
|-
|Win
|
|align=left| Guy Stanford
|UD
|10
|23/07/1994
|align=left| Bismarck, North Dakota, United States
|align=left|
|-
|Win
|
|align=left| Earl Butler
|UD
|12
|19/04/1994
|align=left| Las Vegas, Nevada, United States
|align=left|
|-
|Win
|
|align=left| Willie Edwards
|KO
|1
|12/10/1993
|align=left| Virginia Beach, United States
|align=left|
|-
|Win
|
|align=left| Andrew Maynard
|RTD
|8
|22/05/1993
|align=left| Washington, D.C., United States
|align=left|
|-
|Win
|
|align=left| Art Bayliss
|TKO
|11
|01/12/1992
|align=left| Virginia Beach, United States
|align=left|
|-
|Win
|
|align=left| John Burney
|KO
|2
|22/08/1992
|align=left| Bayamon, Puerto Rico, United States
|align=left|
|-
|Win
|
|align=left| Mike Garcia
|KO
|1
|18/07/1992
|align=left| Las Vegas, Nevada, United States
|align=left|
|-
|Win
|
|align=left| Pat Alley
|PTS
|6
|23/11/1991
|align=left| Atlanta, Georgia, United States
|align=left|
|-
|Win
|
|align=left| Randy Leaks
|TKO
|5
|05/10/1991
|align=left| Reno, Nevada, United States
|align=left|
|-
|Win
|
|align=left| David Martin
|PTS
|6
|30/08/1991
|align=left| Corpus Christi, Texas, United States
|align=left|
|-
|Win
|
|align=left| James Powell
|KO
|1
|27/07/1991
|align=left| Norfolk, Virginia, United States
|align=left|
|-
|Win
|
|align=left| Jay Morgan
|KO
|1
|15/07/1989
|align=left| Stateline, Nevada, United States
|align=left|
|-
|Win
|
|align=left| Anthony Jones
|KO
|1
|30/04/1989
|align=left| Norfolk, Virginia, United States
|align=left|
|-
|Win
|
|align=left| Leroy Moore
|TKO
|1
|14/04/1989
|align=left| Atlantic City, New Jersey, United States
|align=left|
|}

Life after boxing
In 2000 Egerton became a member of ACTRA (Alliance of Canadian Cinema, Television and Radio Artists).

Egerton ran a boxing gym in Toronto's Liberty Village (The Egerton Marcus Boxing Academy) until the summer of 2006 and he still trains amateur boxers.

References

External links
 

1965 births
Black Canadian boxers
Boxers at the 1988 Summer Olympics
Boxers at the 1986 Commonwealth Games
Commonwealth Games competitors for Canada
Guyanese emigrants to Canada
Living people
Olympic boxers of Canada
Olympic silver medalists for Canada
Boxers from Toronto
Olympic medalists in boxing
Medalists at the 1988 Summer Olympics
Afro-Guyanese people
People from Essequibo Islands-West Demerara
Canadian male boxers
Middleweight boxers